Herman Naftali Neuberger (26 June 1918 – 21 October 2005) was an Orthodox rabbi and leader "for over half a century." He was the brother of Albert Neuberger CBE FRS FRCP.

Younger years
Born in Hassfurt, northern Bavaria, he was the son of Meir and Bertha Neuberger (née Hiller), the youngest of three children. His parents hired a teacher, or melamed, to teach him about his heritage and the Torah.

When Herman was eight years old, the Neubergers moved to Würzburg with its sizeable Jewish community so that the three children could prosper and learn. When Herman was only 13, a few weeks after his bar mitzvah, his father died. While in Würzburg the young teenager met Rabbi Shamshon Rafael Weiss, an affluent Torah scholar who became his mentor. Rabbi Weiss convinced him that the best place for him to be was one of the larger yeshivas, so he traveled to Poland to learn in the Mir Yeshiva.

By 1938, Anti-Semitism was growing in Europe due to the rise of the Nazis. Rabbi Neuberger had a relative in New York who was able to send him immigration papers to come to America. Not wanting to leave others behind, he arranged for papers for some of his close relatives too. As good fate would have it, Mrs. Bertha Neuberger and her two other children had already escaped. He also helped Rabbi Dovid Kronglass, who would later become the Mashgiach of Ner Israel, escape.

In America
On a visit to Baltimore, the young yeshiva student met Rabbi Yaakov Yitzchok Ruderman, who a few years prior had started a small yeshiva in a local synagogue, named Ner Israel. Inspired by the great man, Rabbi Neuberger decided to stay in Baltimore and learn in the yeshiva full-time. At that time, the Yeshiva was only five years old and had fewer than forty students. By 1941 the young scholar was already on the Board. He helped with administrative functions and arranged for the construction of a new school building on Garrison Blvd.

Starting a yeshiva
In 1942, Rabbi Neuberger married Judy Kramer, Rabbi Ruderman's sister in-law. They remained married until her death in 1994. During these early years, Rabbi Neuberger helped develop the yeshiva become a true center for Torah.

Saving a nation
He took part in the rescue of Persian Jewry. In 1975 the Shah was still in power in Iran and although the country was secular, Jews had few opportunities to study Torah. Rabbi Neuberger brought a small group of Iranian youngsters to the Yeshiva with the intent that they would go back to Iran after receiving their Rabbinnical degrees to become educators. Before the plan began to bear fruit, it was 1979 and the Ayatollahs took command creating a more awkward situation for Persian Jews. Through a series of connections, Rabbi Neuberger worked to help over 60,000 Jews escape from Iran in an operation still in effect today.

Recognition as a college
At this point in Jewish American history, Orthodox and Haredi yeshivas were not considered colleges and their degrees were not recognized. Rabbi Neuberger, along with his lifelong friend, Rabbi Moshe Sherer started the Association of Advanced Rabbinical and Talmudic Schools to help yeshivas gain recognition amongst American Colleges.

Around the country
Another major accomplishment of Rabbi Neuberger was gathering married bachurim (young yeshiva-men) learning in Kollel Avodas Levi, and sending them out to open outreach kollelim around the country. Today there are kollelim in many cities including Atlanta, Georgia; Phoenix, Arizona;  and Columbus and Cincinnati in Ohio.

Influential Connections
He was described as "politically connected" and was an advisor to city, state and Federal officials on matters affecting his school and fellow Jews around the world.

Legacy
He was survived by his five children, Rabbi Sheftel, who succeeded his father as President of Ner Israel until his death on February 9, 2021, Rabbi Shraga, a Maggid Shiur in the Yeshiva, Yaakov and Isaac, both prominent lawyers in Baltimore, and Rabbi Ezra, Rosh Kollel of Ner Israel.

References

External links
HaRav Naftoli (Herman) Neuberger — Askan and Mechanech
On motzei Shabbos parshas Lech Lecho a hesped for Rabbi Neuberger zt"l was held in Jerusalem.

1918 births
2005 deaths
People from Haßfurt
American Haredi rabbis
Yeshivas Ner Yisroel
Herman
Rabbis from Maryland
Religious leaders from Baltimore
Jewish emigrants from Nazi Germany to the United States
Clergy from Würzburg
Mir Yeshiva alumni
20th-century American rabbis
21st-century American Jews